Ella Franklin-Fraiture (born 15 July 1997) is an English professional footballer who plays as a defender for FA WSL club for Aston Villa.

Career
She joined the academy of Oxford United at the age of 10, and made her first-team debut for the club in 2014 at the age of 16. In the summer of 2018, she joined Leicester City, before signing with Aston Villa in 2019. In May 2021, it was announced that Franklin-Fraiture would leave the club upon the expiry of her contract at the end of the following month.

Personal life
Franklin-Fraiture graduated with a degree in sports science from the University of Birmingham.

References

1997 births
Living people
English women's footballers
Women's association football defenders
Oxford United W.F.C. players
Leicester City W.F.C. players
Aston Villa W.F.C. players
Women's Super League players
Women's Championship (England) players